Shinkichi Mitsumune (光宗 信吉 Mitsumune Shinkichi) (born October 8, 1963) is a Japanese composer who writes music primarily for anime.

Biography
Mitsumune is a native of Fukuoka City in Fukuoka Prefecture and a graduate of Rikkyo University with a degree in business. He started studying music at the age of 4. After graduating from college, he toured music festivals across Japan as a keyboardist for a Marine band, and later for musicians such as Yukie Nishimura. Starting in 1995, he lent his skills to composing anime and movie scores with a full orchestra.

Notable Compositions

TV
Nurse Angel Ririka SOS (1995)
VS Knight Lamune & 40 Fire (1996)
Revolutionary Girl Utena (1997)
Cyber Team in Akihabara (1998)
Yu-Gi-Oh! Duel Monsters (2000)
A Little Snow Fairy Sugar (2001)
Dragon Drive (2002)
Green Green (TV series) (2003)
Rozen Maiden (2004–2005)
Negima! Magister Negi Magi (2005)
Speed Grapher (2005)
Hanbun no Tsuki ga Noboru Sora (2006)
The Familiar of Zero (2006)
Asatte no Houkou (2006)
Sky Girls (2007)
Zero no Tsukaima: Futatsuki no Kishi (2007)
Zero no Tsukaima: Princess no Rondo (2008)
Mahou Sensei Negima 2 (2009)
Zero no Tsukaima F (2012)
Rozen Maiden (2013)
Amagi Brilliant Park (2014)
Yu-Gi-Oh! VRAINS (2017)

OVA
FLCL (2000)
Love Hina Again (2002)
Sky Girls (2006)

Theatrical
Love and Pop (live action) (1998)
Revolutionary Girl Utena (1999)
Cyber Team in Akihabara (1999)

Contributions
For Megumi Hayashibara: Nostalgic Lover, Cherish Christmas, Asu ni Nare
For Maria Yamamoto: Snow Flower
For Power Puff Souls (a group made up of the voice actress who star in the Japanese version of The Powerpuff Girls): Cream Puff Shuffle (Japanese theme song)

References

External links
 
 Shinkichi Mitsumune anime at Media Arts Database 
Review of Nurse Angel Ririka SOS soundtrack 1

1963 births
Anime composers
Japanese film score composers
Japanese keyboardists
Japanese male film score composers
Living people
People from Fukuoka
Rikkyo University alumni